Gordon Frank Newman (born 22 May 1947) is an English writer and television producer. In addition to his two earlier series Law & Order and The Nation's Health, each based on his books, he is known for more recent TV series including Judge John Deed and New Street Law.

Newman's first book, Sir, You Bastard, was a bestseller on publication in 1970. It was to become the first in a series of three works featuring the character of Terry Sneed, an unscrupulous Scotland Yard inspector. The second of these is You Nice Bastard and the third You Flash Bastard/The Price.  Other books he has written include Billy, The List, The Men with the Guns, Charlie and Joanna, Three Professional Ladies, Trading the Future / Circle of Poison, Law and Order, The Nation's Health, and his 2009 novel Crime and Punishment, which was adapted for radio and broadcast as The Corrupted.

Together with screenwriter and novelist Matthew Hall he owns and runs the production company One Eyed Dog Ltd.

Biography

Gordon Newman was born in Kent in 1947. He attended a Stanislavsky acting school in Chislehurst, and wrote a script when he was 18 for the ITV police series No Hiding Place (1959–67). 

Newman's partner Rebecca (Hughes) Hall is also a creative writer. She has scripted plays and films and is an author of books on animal rights.

Writings in relation to personal views

Newman has very strong and sometimes controversial views on a variety of subjects, and these are reflected in his work. He takes an interest in animal rights and is a staunch vegan. When producing or directing television programmes he insists that no meat at all is consumed on the sets. He has compared the slaughter of animals to the holocaust. Newman is a believer in reincarnation and takes influence from the vegetarian John Todd Ferrier.
 	
Newman has no political allegiance to either left or right wing and does not vote.

Bibliography

Terry Sneed trilogy
 Sir, You Bastard aka Rogue Cop (1970)  - Adapted as a 1974 film, The Take 
 You Nice Bastard (1972)   
 You Flash Bastard aka The Price (1974) 

Law & Order

TV Series:
 Detective's Tale (1977)
 Villain's Tale (1977)
 A Brief's Tale (1977)
 Prisoner's Tale (1977)
Books: A trilogy of works consisting of 
'A Detective's Tale'  
'A Villain's Tale'  
'A Prisoner's Tale' 
An omnibus edition including all three was published in 1984 by HarperCollins .

The Nation's Health Published in the UK by HarperCollins, and broadcast on Channel 4 in 1983.
 Acute 
 Decline 
 Chronic 
 Collapse

 Number One (1984, 1985 according to IMDB), about the exploitation of a snooker player by a professional promoter

Screen One

Series One
 Nineteen 96 	(1989)

Series Four
 Black and Blue 	 (1992)

Screen Two

Series Five
 Here is the News 	(1989)

For the Greater Good 	(3 Episodes, BBC, 1991):
 Member 	(1991)
 Mandarin 	(1991)
 Minister 	(1991)

The Healer

 The Healer 	(2 Part TV Movie, BBC, 1994) -The Healer received a Bafta award in 1996.

10x10

Series Eight, Episode 9

 Woe to the Hunter 	(1996)

Judge John Deed 

TV series:
 Pilot (2001)
 Series 1 (2001)
 Series 2 (2002)
 Series 3 (2003–2004)
 Series 4 (2005)
 Series 5 (2006)
 Series 6 (2007)

Books:
 Guilty - Until Proven Otherwise (2020) 

New Street Law (2006-2007)

 Series 1 (2006)
 Series 2 (2007) NB IMDB credits Newman as 'co-creator' of 4 of the 6 episodes of Series 2.

The Corrupted (2013/2015/2017/2018/2020/2021)

The Corrupted is an adaption of Newman's novel Crime and Punishment; it was broadcast on BBC Radio 4's afternoon play slot.

Other Novels
Billy (1972)   (Broadcast, adapted for TV, in BBC's Play for Today: Season 10, Episode 6, -1979) 
The abduction (1972)  
The Player and the Guest (1972)  
Three Professional Ladies (1973)  
The Split (1973)  
The Streetfighter (1975)  
The Guvnor (1978)  
The List (1979)  
The Obsession (1980)  
Charlie and Joanna (1981)  
Men with the Guns (1982)  
Set a Thief (1986)  
Testing Ground (1987)  
Circle of Poison (1995)   -Originally published as Trading The Future (1992)  
Crime and Punishment (2009)  
The Exorcist (A trilogy- part one, 'Dark Heart' ) (2010)

Plays
Operation Bad Apple (1982)  
An Honourable Trade (1984)  

Genre Fiction
Trading the Future (1992)

The Corrupted

The Corrupted is an adaption of his novel Crime and Punishment. It stars Toby Jones as Joseph Olinska.

Series 1, a 10 part radio drama, was broadcast on BBC Radio 4's 'afternoon play' slot in 2013.

Series 2, a further 10 part radio drama, formed the second part, first broadcast on BBC Radio 4 starting 19 January 2015.

Series 3 began airing on Radio 4 on Monday 9 January 2017.

Series 4 began broadcasting on Radio 4 on Monday 25 June 2018.

Series 5 began airing on Radio 4 on Monday 20 April 2020.

Series 6 began airing on Radio 4 on Monday 10 May 2021. [The final series]

Reception

The BBC's Feedback programme on 27/01/2017 included discussion on Series 3 of The Corrupted, including talking "to Radio 4's Commissioning Editor for Drama, Jeremy Howe, about why he felt The Corrupted was worth 7 hours of airtime over just two weeks" and the assessment that "many loved it, though some were not so keen on the venal themes".

Describing the series as 'fiction in a factual world', Feedback went on to note the suggestion in The Corrupted storyline, that, after the character Joseph Oldman had deployed some of his wealth to bankroll the Conservative Party, Margaret Thatcher (ignorant of his gangster background) expressed interest in appointing him to the post of chancellor of the exchequer. It also discussed the murder of Airey Neave, which - although claimed by the INLA - by juxtaposition of themes in the series, it was implied, might have had some level of involvement of the Secret Intelligence Service (SIS), or MI5, who might have desired to silence him to avoid exposure of others with influence.

Opinions

In May 1994 Newman gave a half-hour Opinions lecture televised on Channel 4 and subsequently published in The Independent as "Wisdom Needs No Votes".

Trading The Future

Trading The Future was initially published by Macdonald in the UK in a hardcover edition in 1991. It was subsequently re-released as Circle of Poison, in 1995. See the related topic, Circle of Poison.

For the Greater Good

A three-part Whitehall drama series, with the titles (Member, Mandarin, Minister) reflecting the perspectives of the three principal protagonists (a British Member of Parliament, a Whitehall Civil Servant, and a Government Minister, respectively). It was first aired on the BBC in 1991. Theme music was by Orchestral Manoeuvres in the Dark.

The Nation's Health

The Nation's Health is a 4 episode series written by G.F.Newman based on his book of the same name, originally broadcast on the fledgling Channel 4 UK TV channel in 1983. The series consists of four episodes titled Acute, Decline, Chronic, and Collapse.

Reception

Sherryl Wilson writes: "Although the series is a negative critique of the NHS staff in general, it does also offer a damning insight into the policies that were seen to be disabling the NHS."

In a BMJ abstract one can read:  "How 'little relation to reality' these programmes bore to the NHS in the early 1980s is up for debate, but something in these programmes smacks of truth, raising questions that still need to be asked of the NHS and its staff." Sherryl Wilson draws a comparison with conclusions from the 2009 enquiry into Stafford Hospital. The BMJ abstract continues "These programmes make fascinating if difficult watching, because they do not show the deference towards the medical profession and the NHS shown by previous British dramas such as Doctor Finlay’s Casebook, General Hospital, and Emergency Ward 10. Their gritty influence on later British medical dramas, such as Casualty can be seen clearly."

References

External links
 
 The author's site
 'one-eyed-dog' (film company) site

1946 births
20th-century British male writers
20th-century British novelists
21st-century British male writers
21st-century British novelists
British animal rights activists
British male novelists
British male television writers
British television producers
British television writers
British veganism activists
Living people